Puya tuberosa is a species in the genus Puya. This species is endemic to Bolivia.

Cultivars
 Puya 'Poseidon's Trident'

References

BSI Cultivar Registry Retrieved 11 October 2009

tuberosa
Flora of Bolivia